Don't Fool Yourself Dear (Spanish: No te engañes corazón) is a 1937 Mexican comedy-drama film directed by Miguel Contreras Torres and starring Carlos Orellana. It is the first full-feature film of Mexican comedian Cantinflas after becoming a star of the carpa circuit (folk theater). It was also one of the earliest films of Orellana and Sara García and the first where they share the screen.

This film was released in DVD format on October 26, 2004.

Plot
Don Boni (Orellana) is diagnosed with a deadly disease and decides to spend his last days doing good deeds. He leaves his wife and decides to help people. He then gets drunk and wakes up with a winning lottery ticket and realizes that the doctor who diagnosed him has been sent to prison for fraud.

Cast
Carlos Orellana as Don Bonifacio "Boni" Bonafé
Sara García as Doña Petronila "Petro" (as Sarah Garcia)
Natalia Ortiz as Consuelito
Eusebio Pirrín as Friend of Canti (as Don Catarino)
Eduardo Vivas as Don Gregorio "Goyo" Vidal
Cantinflas as Canti
Carmen Molina as Carmencita
Joaquín Coss as Señor Rebolledo
Carlos Villatoro as Alfredo
Manuel Buendía as Señor Palomares
Gerardo del Castillo as Friend of Goyo (as G. del Castillo)
Matilde Corell as Lady Student (uncredited)
Paco Martínez as Señor Monforte, landlord (uncredited)
Ismael Rodríguez as Office Worker (uncredited)
Fanny Schiller as Refugio (uncredited)
Estanislao Shilinsky as Restaurant Client (uncredited)
Juan Villegas as Waiter (uncredited)

Critical reception
Introducing an analysis of Cantinflas' career, essayist Carlos Monciváis refers to the actor's performance in this picture as "his disregarded debut in an inauspicious film."

References

External links
 
 No Te Engañes Corazón at Yahoo! Movies

1937 films
1937 comedy-drama films
1930s Spanish-language films
Mexican black-and-white films
Mexican comedy-drama films
1930s Mexican films